Souleater is an EP by Surgery. It was released in 1989 through Circuit Records.

Track listing

Personnel 
Surgery
Scott Kleber – guitar
John Lachapelle – bass guitar
John Leamy – drums
Sean McDonnell – vocals, guitar
Production and additional personnel
Kramer – production, engineering
Surgery – production

References

External links 
 

1989 EPs
Albums produced by Kramer (musician)
Surgery (band) albums